Matthew Joseph Manotoc (born December 9, 1988) is a Filipino politician and athlete from Ilocos Norte, Philippines. He currently serves as the governor of Ilocos Norte and was a senior provincial board member from the second legislative district of Ilocos Norte from 2016 to 2019.

Early life and education 
Manotoc was born on December 9, 1988 in Morocco, the youngest son of Imee Romualdez Marcos and Tommy La'O Manotoc. He is a member of the Marcos family. At the time of his birth, his parents were in exile in Morocco reportedly living under false passports.

In 2006, he went to the United States to study Psychology at Claremont McKenna College.

Political career

Ilocos Norte Provincial Board (2016–2019)

Manotoc ran as a provincial board member representing the 2nd legislative district of Ilocos Norte in the 2016 Philippine local elections, and won. He was also declared as the Senior Provincial Board Member of Ilocos Norte, which made him the third highest-ranking official of the province. From 2016 to 2019, he was also chairman of the National Movement of Young Legislators – Ilocos Norte Chapter.

Governor of Ilocos Norte (2019–present)
In October 2018, Manotoc filed his certificate of candidacy to run for vice governor of Ilocos Norte in the 2019 Philippine gubernatorial elections as the running mate of his grandmother, Imelda Marcos. However, Marcos, having been convicted of graft, withdrew from the race in November 2018 and was substituted by Manotoc. He then went on to win the race, unopposed after Rodolfo Fariñas withdrew days before the election, succeeding his mother who ran for senator.

Upon taking office, one of his objectives was to make health services more accessible and more inclusive by funding and upgrading medical facilities and public health programs. In October 2019, he launched his flagship program, “NariMAT nga Aglawlaw,” which aimed to strengthen Ilocos Norte's bid for cleaner, greener, and healthier environment. He was reelected in 2022, this time defeating Fariñas.

Personal life 
He is the grandson of the late president Ferdinand Marcos Sr. and former First Lady Imelda Marcos.

Manotoc is an avid golfer and basketball player. He was a basketball coach at the International School Manila and a co-founder of Espiritu Manotoc Basketball Management.

In 2019, it was reported that he was dating Miss Earth 2014 Jamie Herrell.

Notes

References 

1988 births
Living people
Governors of Ilocos Norte
Filipino business executives
Filipino men's basketball coaches
Provincial board members in the Philippines
Nacionalista Party politicians
Ilocano people
Marcos family
Ateneo de Manila University alumni
Asian Institute of Management alumni
University of California, Los Angeles alumni
Claremont McKenna College alumni